Two Women may refer to:

 Two women (novel) (Italian: La Ciociara), a 1957 novel by Alberto Moravia
 Two Women (1919 film), a 1919 American film starring Anita Stewart
 Two Women (1940 film), a 1940 French film directed by Léonide Moguy
 Two Women (1947 film), a 1947 Swedish film directed by Arnold Sjöstrand
 Two Women (Italian: La Ciociara), a 1960 Italian film directed by Vittorio De Sica based on the novel
 Two Women (1975 film), a 1975 Egyptian film directed by Hassan Ramzi
 Two Women (1992 film), a 1992 Algerian film directed by Omar Trebach
 Two Women (1999 film), a 1999 Persian film
 Two Women (2014 film), a 2014 Russian film directed by Vera Glagoleva
 Two Women, a painting by Francisco Goya
 Two Women (opera) (Italian: La Ciociara), Marco Tutino based on the novel